The Nuova Mala del Brenta, also known as Mafia veneta ("Venetian Mafia") or Mafia del Piovese, was an organized crime group based in the Veneto and Friuli-Venezia Giulia, north-eastern Italy.

The criminal organization's structure was like a Cosa Nostra and Camorra model, but more violent. It is considered by the Italian government and Prefecture of Venice as including all the characteristics of Article 416 bis-cp, the legislative definition of a mafia-type organisation with Mafia (Cosa Nostra, 'Ndrangheta, Camorra, Sacra Corona Unita, Società foggiana) affiliations within Italy.

Origins
In the 1960s and 1970s, a number of high-ranking members of the Sicilian Mafia were sent in solitary confinement in various provincial towns in the Veneto and Friuli-Venezia Giulia regions; mostly around the cities of Vicenza, Padua, Trieste and Venice, in an attempt to isolate powerful Sicilian ringleaders from other members in the Mafia.
The most notable Sicilian mafiosi included: Salvatore Contorno, Gaetano Fidanzati, Antonino Duca and Gaetano and Salvatore Badalamenti, and Giuseppe Madonia. Veneti malavitosi, or underworld figures and bandits from the Veneto and Friuli-Venezia Giulia, began to seek contact with these Sicilian criminals and eventually organized themselves, obtaining enough power to take the reins of the organization. What started as a small gang of criminals controlling racketeering along the Riviera del Brenta between Padua and Venice, became an international syndicate under the "boss" Felice Maniero.

Criminal panorama of Veneto
Before the arrival of these high-calibre Sicilian mobsters, Veneto's crime problem was restricted to various disorganised gangs operating throughout the region. In the 1980s, just before the emergence of the Mala del Brenta, there were already a few organized crime syndicates that would later be incorporated under the central authority of the Mala del Brenta.
These organizations included:

"Clan Giostrai" -- various affiliated groups of nomad criminals, mostly from the provinces of Vicenza, Padova and Venice, of whom a number had a relation to the carnival fair businesses. These were involved in bank heists, robberies, the drug trade, and kidnapping for ransom.
The "Mestrini" group, based in Mestre, on the immediate Venetian mainland:  a powerful group with strong ties to the Mala del Brenta, their most lucrative trade was drug trafficking, but the group was involved in a vast array of criminal enterprises. Most notably, the ownership of many abusive water taxis that would bring foreign tourists to shops and hotels in Venice that were owned by the clans associates. The "zoccolo duro" or top capos of the organisation were: Gino Causin, Gilberto "Lolli" Boatto, Paolo Tenderini, Roberto "Paja" Paggiarin and Paolo Pattarello.
The "Veneziani", the old criminal underworld of Venice, engaged in the same activities of the "Mestrini":  the group was headed by the Rizzi brothers and Giancarlo Millo, nicknamed "The Martian".
The San Donà di Piave cartel, under the leadership of Silvano Maritan, nicknamed "The President", protégé of the confined Cosa Nostra boss Salvatore Contorno, the rivalry with another cartel based in the same area caused a number of violent confrontations and subsequently placed Maritan as capo of the eastern part of the province of Venice, that is until he gave up a percentage of his assets to Felice Maniero.

Life of Maniero
Maniero was born in the impoverished village of Campolongo Maggiore in Venice, where he started his own crew of local gangsters, composed of family members and childhood friends that would later hold the reins of his criminal empire. While becoming a major criminal presence in the area, he was befriended by a number of prominent Sicilian mafiosi who backed him up in his vision of uniting Veneto organised crime.

Maniero's establishment subsequently controlled all criminal ventures in the region; all other organised crime groups in the region had been subjugated by the group originating from Campolongo Maggiore and backed up by the Sicilians and also members of the Camorra. All except the exponents of the "Veneziani" clan, the Rizzi brothers, were feeling menaced by the mainland syndicates under Maniero, but the other "Veneziano" capo Millo, was a personal friend of Maniero, and preferred collaborating with "Angel Face" and his allies.
While dining at a restaurant, Millo was shot and killed on March 17, 1990 by the Rizzi brothers, a violent feud ensued, between the Mala del Brenta and the "Veneziani", after six months, the Rizzi brothers and an associate were treacherously murdered in an ambush disguised as a meeting to discuss peace terms, Maniero placed Giovanni Giada as head of the Mala del Brenta in the Venetian lagoon. He was now in firm control of all Veneto.

Affiliations and criminal activity
The organisation has had a number of high-level political connections outside Italy (Croatia and Yugoslavia, Malta, Hungary and  Austria). At one point, Maniero was a personal friend of the son of the former Croatian president Franjo Tuđman and was involved in the supply of guns to Croatia, in the early 1990s.

The organisation had a firm hold of nearly every criminal venture in the region, from money laundering to loansharking and extortion, but its major source of income was drug dealing; the group bought massive amount of cocaine directly from the Sicilian and Colombian Mafia, as well as heroin from Turkish drug baron Nvo Berisa, who helped a number of Venetian mobsters in hiding in Turkey, including Felice Maniero and Antonio Pandolfo, the group's second in command.

Its members are exclusively native to the Veneto region, but with a number of associates operating in the region from Cosa Nostra, Camorra and it is believed from the Ndrangheta as well. It is also known that Brenta mafiosi have colluded with Stidda members on a number of occasions involving a number of fraudulent scams at a Maltese casino in 2002.

Downfall

The organisation was thought to be dismantled in late 1994, due to revelations that the former boss Maniero was captured by a task force of 400 policemen issued with the sole task of bringing Maniero and his associates down. After being arrested in Turin in 1993 (having previously evaded the Padua and Vicenza prisons) together with many of the top members of the syndicate.

Maniero, faced with life imprisonment, turned informant, helping the Italian police dismantle the organisation he himself had created, contributing to the arrest of more than 400 of the mob's members, as well as a number of judges, policemen, and local Venetian businessmen that had aligned themselves with the organisation.

Although it has been revealed that Maniero continued a number of criminal activities and many of his former henchmen re-organised the Mala del Brenta to ensure survival, it is now called Nuova Mala del Brenta or Nuova Mafia Veneta and it still influences many criminal ventures in the region, ranging from robberies and bank heists to arms and drug trafficking.

Recent years
In August 1996, the members of the re-instated gang, coordinated a spectacularly successful heist at the "Mirabilandia" theme park securing 350 billion lira in an attempt to get the group back on its feet after the revelations of Maniero and other turncoats.

In May 2005, Francesco Tonicello a member of the old Mala del Brenta, was arrested in London after having been on the run for a number of years as one of Italy's most wanted men. A master forger, he worked under 11 aliases and fenced priceless artworks, antiques and gold for Venetian godfather "Angel Face" Maniero, as well as participating in a brutal double homicide.

In April 2005, the carabinieri kill Luigi Quatela a top member of the syndicate in Chiampo, in the province of Vicenza

In August 2006, the massive "Ghost Dog" operation undergoes, Italian police arrest over 60 exponents of the criminal organization, including policemen on the group's payroll. After two years of investigation, and the precious reveletians of the turncoats Stefano Galletto and Giuseppe Pastore, police deal a severe blow to the organisation, arresting local gang leaders in the provinces of Venice, Padua, Vicenza and Verona, most notably Achille Pozzi, from Padua, and Giorgio Fontana from Vicenza, together with their respective henchmen.

In July 2007, the Carabinieri busted a criminal group composed of ex Mala del Brenta associates and nomad criminals from the province of Vicenza, they were trying to form a new group made up of the older elitè members of mala del Brenta who had escaped or finished prison sentences and Vicenza and Bassano del Grappa criminals engaging in drug trade and robberies, the group had been responsible for five gangland killings in the last three months, but turncoat Maich Gabrielli helped dismantle the group after witnessing the murder of 26-year-old cousin Emanuele Crovi.

In August 2007, a seventeen-year-old Tunisian boy was kidnapped as a result of hostilities between immigrant drug dealers.
Beaten and held hostage for several days in Padua's periphery, his kidnappers were two Albanians and an Italian slightly older than he was. When the Carabinieri came to liberate the hostage a gunfight ensued, with a Carabiniere remaining wounded, the juvenile criminals succeeded in escaping in a car whose number plates belonged to  a capo of the Nuova Mala del Brenta, when the Carabinieri deepened their investigation into the incident, they uncovered a series of a new alliances between the syndicate and a number of immigrant youth gangs present in the city of Padua.

In October 2007, Italian police arrest Ercole Salvan, member of the syndicate, and one of the most feared bandits of the region, hailing from Cittadella (Padova), he had been on the run since the murder of a truck driver during a highway robbery.

In November 2007, a task force of about a hundred Italian and Spanish policemen, interrupt a steady flow of cocaine, from South America via Spain to North-Eastern Italy controlled by one of the organisations top members, the infamous Silvano Maritan, head of the San Donà di Piave cartel, already one of the head figures in the "old" mala del Brenta. After exiting prison in 2001, he took control of the drug trade in eastern Veneto, supplying cocaine in a number of discos all along the Venetian coastal resorts.

In May 2008, Italian investigators uncovered a plan to free bosses Lucio Calabresi and Mariano Magro from their prison in Vicenza. The man who intended to do this was Raffaele Vassallo, the plan was to subsequently murder a judge, two police captains, turncoat Stefano Galletto and his family and finally Felice Maniero in a series of terrorist attacks to be carried out with explosives and rocket launchers. A warehouse full of armaments was found in Padua's industrial area, and the would-be ideators of the plan were arrested.

In November 2008, the Carabinieri busted an unusual criminal joint-venture made of former Far Right and Far Left terrorists, associates of the old Milan organized crime and Nuova Mala associates, above all Fiorenzo Trincanato, once one of Felice Maniero's enforcers. This group is believed to be involved with drug trafficking in the Northern Italy, controlling cocaine trade from Veneto to Liguria.

Notes

References
 Dianese, Maurizio © 1995 Il bandito Felice Maniero, il Cardo editore Venice.
 Maniero, Felice © (with Pasqualetto, Andrea ©) Una vita criminale, Marsilio Editore.
 Zornetta, Monica & Guerretta, Danilo © 2006 A casa nostra: Cinquant'anni di mafia e criminalità in Veneto Edito da Baldini Castoldi Dalai,  
 Felice Maniero, Italian Wiki article
 Mala del Brenta, Italian Wiki article
 La Nuova Mala del Brenta
 Blitz against the "Nuova Mala del Brenta" (Corriere della Sera - Jan. 2006)
 Articolo 416 bis-c.p.: Mafia e associazione, una realtà
https://www.mirror.co.uk/celebs/news/2010/10/10/x-factor-hopeful-nicolo-festa-in-link-to-mafia-boss-115875-22622726/

1970s establishments in Italy
Organised crime groups in Italy
Secret societies related to organized crime